The 1991 Railway Cup Hurling Championship was the 64th staging of the Railway Cup, the Gaelic Athletic Association's premier inter-provincial hurling tournament. The championship began on 10 March 1991 and ended on 7 April 1991.

Connacht were the defending champions.

On 7 April 1991, Connacht won the cup following a 1-13 to 0-12 defeat of Munster in the final. This was their 8th Railway Cup title and their second in succession after winning the last cup title in 1989.

Results

Semi-finals

Final

Scoring statistics

Top scorers overall

Top scorers in a single game

Bibliography
 Donegan, Des, The Complete Handbook of Gaelic Games (DBA Publications Limited, 2005).

References

Railway Cup Hurling Championship
Railway Cup Hurling Championship
Hurling